Magyaron also Magyarons is the name of a Transcarpathian ethno-cultural group, which has an openly Hungarian orientation. They renounced their native language, culture and religion and promoted Magyarization of the Rusyn and Ukrainian population. The Magyarons did not embrace the Ukrainian identity of the Ruthenians in Carpathian Ruthenia but maintained their separate Rusyns identity. From 1920 to 1940, the group promoted the idea of re-joining Subcarpathian Rus' to Hungary.

History 
The term "Magyaron" and "Magyaronian", meaning national betrayal or treason, originated in the 19th century and in the first half of the 20th century in Ruthenian environments and was used to describe magyarized Ruthenians.

Acculturation practices (magyarization) conducted by Hungarian authorities were the principal factor in the emergence of the Magyarons. In the Hungarian kingdom, living conditions and a psychological climate were created which pressured minorities to adapt by renouncing their own national culture, language, political, religious, and other views. In Hungarian society, only adherence to these acculturation practices made it possible to obtain education, occupy a high position and enjoy career advancement, or simply have means of subsistence.

In time of Ukrainian Revolution, the Magyarons conducted activities against the accession of Transcarpathia to West Ukrainian People's Republic.

During World War II, Magyarons worked closely with the Hungarian government, attacked the Sichovyks (soldiers of Carpathian Sich)  and participated in torture and shootings of them.

Hungarian-Rusyn People's Council
On November 9, 1918 in Ungvár (now Uzhhorod, Ukraine), the "Hungarian-Rusyn People's Council" was formed by the Magyarons, headed by the canon of the Greek Catholic Eparchy of Munkács, Simeon Sabov (1863–1929). The Hungarian-Rusyn People's Council adopted the "Memorandum", which stated that the Hungarian-Rusyn people would join their homeland, Hungary, and advocated for the integrity of its territory.

The main Magyarons party in Transcarpathia was the Autonomous Agricultural Union, founded in 1924 by Kurtyak Ivan Fedorovich. This party was called "Kurtyakiv", and its followers were called kurtyakivtsi.

See also 
 Little Russian identity
 
 Greater Hungary
 Magyarization

References

Sources 
 Довідник з історії України

Further reading 
 

History of Zakarpattia Oblast
Rusyns
Demographics of Czechoslovakia
Ethnic and religious slurs
Cultural assimilation